Sharon Quirk-Silva (born September 17, 1962) is an American politician and educator serving as a member of the California State Assembly, representing the 65th Assembly District, which includes portions of northern Orange County, including La Palma, Cypress, Fullerton and Buena Park.

Early life and education 
Quirk-Silva was born in Los Angeles and raised in Fullerton, California. Quirk-Silva earned an Associates of Arts degree from Fullerton College, a Bachelor of Arts in sociology from University of California, Los Angeles and a teaching credential from California State University, Fullerton.

Personal life 
She was married to Shawn Quirk from 1985 to 2006. Her current husband, Jesus Silva, is an educator who was elected Mayor of Fullerton in 2018. Quirk-Silva has four children.

Career 
Prior to her service in the Assembly, she was the Mayor of Fullerton and an elementary school teacher.

She was first elected to the Assembly in an upset, unseating Republican Assemblyman Chris Norby by a narrow margin in 2012. Quirk-Silva sought a second term in 2014, but was defeated by Republican Young Kim, a former legislative aide. She recaptured her old Assembly seat after defeating Kim in a 2016 rematch after a heated and expensive election. In 2018, she won re-election over music teacher Alexandria Coronado.  In 2020, she was reelected over realtor Cynthia Thacker. In 2022, she was reelected over ABC Unified School District  Trustee Soo Yoo.

Election history

2012

2014

2016

2018

2020

2022

District 67

References

External links 
 
 Campaign website
 Join California Sharon Quirk-Silva

Democratic Party members of the California State Assembly
Living people
1962 births
21st-century American politicians
Women state legislators in California
21st-century American women politicians
Politicians from Los Angeles
People from Fullerton, California
Mayors of places in California
Women mayors of places in California
University of California, Los Angeles alumni
California State University, Fullerton alumni